The Ampasindava mine is the site for a possible rare earths mine in Madagascar. The concession is located in the municipality of Mangaoka, Diana Region in northern Madagascar on the eastern side of the Ampasindava Peninsula. The deposit has reserves amounting to 130 million tonnes of ore grading 0.08% RE. The mine is owned by Tantalus Rare Earths Malagasy Sarl. In 2019, ISR Capital signed a memorandum of understanding with the China Nonferrous Metal Mining Group to develop the mine. Conservation groups have opposed development of the mine, pointing to possible damage the mine could have on wildlife, such as Mittermeier's sportive lemur which is native to the peninsula. As of September 2020, Reeenova applied for a full license to begin mining the deposit.

The first exploration licenses for the mine was held by Calibra  Resources  and  Engineers in 2003, sold to Zebu Metals in 2008, and then to Tantalus Rare Earths in 2009. In 2012, Tantalus agreed to supply the rare-earth products of the mine to the company Rhodia. Tantalus went bankrupt in 2015. In June 2016, 60% ownership of Tantalus was held by the Singapore-based REO Magnetic Pte. Ltd., and 40% by the Germany-based Tantalus Rare Earths AG. In June and July 2016, the REO sold its stake in the mine to  the Singapore-based ISR Capital Ltd.  In 2019, ISR was renamed Reenova Investment Holding. Rennova sold its 75% interest in the project in 2021 for $4.5 million USD to the GRM Group.

References 

Rare earths mines in Madagascar
Ambanja
Diana Region